Kaohsiung Municipal Kaohsiung Girls' Senior High School abbreviated as KGHS is an all-girls high school located in Cianjin District, Kaohsiung, Taiwan.

History
Japanese rule:
 1924:Founded officially. 
 1928: The first graduation ceremony was held.

Post-war period:
 1945:The recovery of Taiwan, 11 Tong-Jong Chen took over the Commission sent to the school to receive, temporarily principal duties, in December was ordered to be renamed the Taiwan Provincial Kaohsiung First Girls High School
 July 2009 : Lin Quanyi as the principal

See also
 Secondary education in Taiwan

External links

 Official website

Schools in Kaohsiung
Educational institutions established in 1924
1924 establishments in Taiwan
High schools in Taiwan
Girls' schools in Taiwan